Coruripe is a  municipality located in the southern coast of the Brazilian state of Alagoas. Its population is 57,294 (2020) and its area is 913 km². It is the largest municipality in Alagoas by area, but among the largest municipalities of each Brazilian state, it is the smallest. It is situated at the edge of Coruripe river.

References

Populated coastal places in Alagoas
Municipalities in Alagoas